The Rio Felix Bridge at Hagerman, about one mile from Hagerman, New Mexico, was built in 1926.  It was listed on the National Register of Historic Places in 1997.

It is a three-span Pratt through truss bridge, on the former alignment of New Mexico Highway 2, just east of the bridge on the current alignment of the same highway.  It brought the highway across the Rio Felix, near that river's confluence with the Pecos River.  It rests on two concrete abutments and two concrete piers, with each of the three spans  in length.

References

Pratt truss bridges
National Register of Historic Places in Chaves County, New Mexico
Buildings and structures completed in 1926
Bridges in New Mexico